Glenoglossa wassi is a species of eel in the family Ophichthidae.  It is the only member of its genus.  It is found in the eastern Pacific Ocean in the vicinity of American Samoa.

References

Ophichthidae
Fish described in 1982